The Duke of Aarschot (or Aerschot) was one of the most important aristocratic titles in the Low Countries, named after the Brabantian city of Aarschot. The title was held by the House of Croÿ and the House of Arenberg. The present Duke is Leopold-Engelbert-Evrard de Arenberg-Ligne.

Lords of Aarschot
Godfried of Brabant (12??-1302), Lord of Aarschot, killed in the Battle of the Golden Spurs.
Margaretha of Lorraine-Vaudémont (1420–1477), Lady of Aarschot. Married to Antoine de Croy, Comte de Porcéan.
Philip I of Croy (1435–1511), 2nd count of Porcéan, 2nd count of Guînes and Lord of Aarschot.
Henry de Croÿ (1456–1514), 3rd count of Porcéan, count of Seneghem and lord of Aarschot

Margrave of Aarschot
William de Croÿ (1458–1521), since 1518, Count of Beaumont, Duke of Sora and Arce, and since 1521, Margrave of Aarschot.

Dukes of Aarschot

House of Croÿ

Philippe II de Croÿ (1496–1549), since 1514, Count of Porcéan, since 1521, Duke of Sora and Arce, 2nd Count of Beaumont, since 1532, Margrave of Renty, and since 1532, first Duke of Aarschot.
Charles II de Croÿ (1522–1551), 2nd Duke of Aarschot.
Philippe III de Croÿ (1526–1595), 3rd Duke of Aarschot.
Charles III de Croÿ (1560–1612), 4th Duke of Aarschot.
Anne de Croÿ, 5th Duchess of Aarschot (1568–1614), married to Charles de Ligne, 2nd Prince of Arenberg

House of Arenberg-Ligne

Philippe-Charles, 3rd Count of Arenberg (1587–1640), 6th Duke of Aarschot
Philip Francis, 1st Duke of Arenberg (1625–1674), 7th Duke of Aarschot
Charles Eugene, 2nd Duke of Arenberg (1633–1681), 8th Duke of Aarschot
Philip Charles Francis (1663–1691), 9th Duke of Aarschot
Leopold (1690–1754), 10th Duke of Aarschot
Charles Marie Raymond (1721–1778), 11th Duke of Aarschot
Louis Engelbert (1750–1820), 12th Duke of Aarschot
Prosper Louis (1785–1861), 13th Duke of Aarschot
Engelbert Auguste (1824–1875), 14th Duke of Aarschot
Engelbert Prosper (1872–1949), 15th Duke of Aarschot
Engelbert Charles (1899–1974), 16th Duke of Aarschot
Erik Charles (1901–1992), 17th Duke of Aarschot
Jean-Engelbert (1921-2011), 18th Duke of Aarschot
Leopold-Engelbert-Evrard (1956-), 19th Duke of Aarschot

Dukes of Belgium
 
Arenberg family